One Fat Sucka is the second live album by progressive rock band Umphrey's McGee. It was recorded at various concerts throughout the summer and fall of 2000. Most of the material contains brand new guitarist Jake Cinninger, who joined the band in September 2000. Two songs recorded before Cinninger joined, "Siddhartha" and "Wild Brumby," feature special guest Dr. Didg on didgeridoo. The album has been out of print since 2002, but was released in December 2009 as part of the CustUm Flash Drive that included the complete Umphrey's McGee discography.

Track listing
 All Things Ninja
 Out Of Order
 Professor Wormbog
 Wild Brumby
 Example 1
 Siddhartha
 Thin Air
 Sweetness
 Phil's Farm

Personnel
Brendan Bayliss: guitar, vocals
Jake Cinninger: guitar (except tracks 4 & 6)
Joel Cummins: keyboards
Ryan Stasik: bass
Mike Mirro: drums
Andy Farag: percussion

References

Umphrey's McGee albums
2000 live albums